US Racing is an auto racing team based in Kerpen, Germany.

History
US Racing is the joint Formula 4 team of Ralf Schumacher and Gerhard Ungar. The championship team of the ADAC Formula 4 season 2015 has moved its seat to Kerpen at the end of 2015 and will be racing from the 2016 season with the new team name US Racing after HTP Motorsport ended its involvement in the team. "US Racing not only stands for the names Ungar and Schumacher, but is also intended to convey the English meaning of "we" and "us", because we want to express the team idea again. Because it is only through the commitment of every team member that you can succeed," says Ralf Schumacher. In 2018, US Racing collaborated with Charouz Racing System in the ADAC Formula 4 championship.
In 2019, US Racing joined the Formula Regional European Championship and Italian F4 Championship.

Current series results

Italian F4 Championship

†Perino drove for DR Formula until round 4.

Formula Winter Series

Former series results

Formula Regional European Championship

Formula 4 UAE Championship

†Beckhäuser drove for Cram Motorsport in the first four rounds and again in round 6.

ADAC Formula 4

Timeline

References

External links 

 

German auto racing teams
Auto racing teams established in 2015

Formula Regional European Championship teams